Pseudovirus can refer to

 a virus artificially created by pseudotyping to contain envelope proteins from a different virus
 Pseudovirus (genus), a genus of viruses in the family Pseudoviridae